The 2011 6 Hours of Imola was an auto racing event held at Autodromo Enzo e Dino Ferrari on July 3, 2011.  It was the third round of the 2011 Le Mans Series season and the fourth round of the 2011 Intercontinental Le Mans Cup.

Qualifying

Qualifying Result
Pole position winners in each class are marked in bold.

Race result
Class winners in bold.  Cars failing to complete 70% of winner's distance marked as Not Classified (NC).

Patrick Long stayed behind the wheel 15 minutes longer than the time limit and the #63 was subsequently disqualified.

References

Imola
6 Hours of Imola
Six Hours of Imola
Imola